Claudiu Constantin Herea (born 16 March 1990) is a Romanian footballer who plays as a midfielder for CS Tunari. He is the younger brother of Ovidiu Herea, also a footballer.

References

External links
 
 

1990 births
Living people
Footballers from Bucharest
Romanian footballers
Association football midfielders
Liga I players
Liga II players
Liga III players
CS Brănești players
FC Viitorul Constanța players
FC Rapid București players
CS Balotești players
Sepsi OSK Sfântu Gheorghe players
FC Petrolul Ploiești players
FC Metaloglobus București players